Presidential primaries and caucuses are being organized by the Republican Party to select the delegates to the 2024 Republican National Convention scheduled to be held between February and June 2024 to determine the party's nominee for president of the United States in the 2024 U.S. presidential election. The elections will take place in all 50 U.S. states, the District of Columbia, and five U.S. territories (these territories do not participate in the presidential election, although Guam does hold a straw poll). On November 15, 2022, at Mar-a-Lago, former president Donald Trump announced that he would run again in 2024. He is seeking to become the second president after Grover Cleveland to serve two non-consecutive terms.

In March 2022, Trump announced that if he runs for re-election and wins the Republican presidential nomination, his former Vice President Mike Pence will not be his running mate.

On February 14, 2023, former South Carolina governor Nikki Haley, who served as U.S. ambassador to the United Nations during the Trump administration, announced her candidacy for president, making her the second major candidate in the race.

On February 21, 2023, executive chairman of Strive Asset Management and former CEO of Roivant Sciences, Vivek Ramaswamy, an activist against environmental, social and corporate governance initiatives, announced his candidacy for the presidency while on Tucker Carlson Tonight.

Candidates

Declared major candidates 
While Trump is considered an early frontrunner for the Republican presidential nomination, he faces challenges: the public hearings of the U.S. House Select Committee on the January 6 Attack have damaged public opinion towards him; Florida Governor Ron DeSantis raised more campaign funds in the first half of 2022; Democrats may attempt to invoke the Fourteenth Amendment to the U.S. Constitution to prevent Trump from being eligible; and he is currently the subject of four distinct criminal investigations into his activities while in office.

The candidates in this section have declared their candidacies and received substantial media coverage, hold or have held significant elected office, and/or have been included in at least five national polls.

Other declared candidates
The candidates in this section are otherwise noteworthy, but have not met the requirements outlined above.
Perry Johnson, businessman, candidate for Governor of Michigan in 2022
Steve Laffey, mayor of Cranston, Rhode Island (2003–2007)
Corey Stapleton, Montana Secretary of State (2017–2021), member of the Montana Senate from the 27th District (2001–2009)

Decision pending 
, the following notable individuals are expected to make an announcement regarding their official candidacy within a set timeline.
 Chris Christie, 55th Governor of New Jersey (2010–2018), U.S. Attorney for New Jersey (2002–2008), Member of the Morris County Board of Chosen Freeholders (1995–1997), candidate for president in 2016(decision expected by May 2023)
 Ron DeSantis, 46th Governor of Florida (2019–present), United States Representative from FL-06 (2013–2018) (decision expected no earlier than May 2023)
 Larry Elder, radio host, author, attorney, and candidate in the 2021 California gubernatorial recall election (decision expected March 2023)
 Asa Hutchinson, 46th Governor of Arkansas (2015–2023), 8th Administrator of Drug Enforcement (2001–2003), United States Representative from AR-03 (1997–2001), U.S. Attorney for Western Arkansas (1982–1985) (decision expected April 2023)
 Mike Pence, 48th Vice President of the United States (2017–2021), 50th Governor of Indiana (2013–2017), United States Representative from IN-02 (2001–2003) and IN-06 (2003–2013) (decision expected in spring 2023)
 Mike Pompeo, 70th United States Secretary of State (2018–2021), 6th Director of the Central Intelligence Agency (2017–2018), United States Representative from KS-04 (2011–2017) (decision expected in spring 2023)

Publicly expressed interest
, the following notable individuals have expressed an interest in running for president within the previous six months.

John Bolton, 27th United States National Security Advisor (2018–2019), 25th United States Ambassador to the United Nations (2005–2006), 3rd Under Secretary of State for Arms Control and International Security Affairs (2001–2005), 18th Assistant Secretary of State for International Organization Affairs (1989–1993), U.S. Assistant Attorney General (1985–1989)
 Liz Cheney, United States Representative from WY-AL (2017–2023)
 Kristi Noem, 33rd Governor of South Dakota (2019–present), United States Representative from SD-AL (2011–2019), member of the South Dakota House of Representatives from the 6th district (2007–2011)
 Tim Scott, U.S. Senator from South Carolina (2013–present), United States Representative from SC-01 (2011–2013), member of the South Carolina House of Representatives from the 117th district (2009–2011), member of the Charleston County Council from the 3rd district (1995–2009)
 Francis X. Suarez, 43rd Mayor of Miami (2017–present), member of the Miami City Commission (2009–2017)
 Chris Sununu, 82nd Governor of New Hampshire (2017–present), member of the New Hampshire Executive Council (2011–2017)

Potential candidates

, there has been speculation about the potential candidacy of the following notable individuals within the previous six months. 
 Greg Abbott, 48th Governor of Texas (2015–present), 50th Texas Attorney General (2002–2015), Associate Justice of the Supreme Court of Texas (1996–2001)

 Doug Ducey, 23rd Governor of Arizona (2015–2023), 42nd Treasurer of Arizona (2011–2015)

 Will Hurd, United States Representative from TX-23 (2015–2021)

 Brian Kemp, 83rd Governor of Georgia (2019–present), 27th Georgia Secretary of State (2010–2018), member of the Georgia State Senate from the 46th district (2003–2007)

 Glenn Youngkin, 74th Governor of Virginia (2022–present)

Declined to be candidates
The following notable individuals have been the subject of speculation about their possible candidacy, but have publicly denied interest in running.

 Marsha Blackburn, U.S. Senator from Tennessee (2019–present), United States Representative (2003–2019), member of the Tennessee Senate from the 23rd district (1999–2003)
 Tucker Carlson, host of Tucker Carlson Tonight (2016–present) and co-founder of The Daily Caller
 Tom Cotton, U.S. Senator from Arkansas (2015–present), United States Representative from AR-04 (2013–2015)
 Dan Crenshaw, United States Representative from TX-02 (2019–present)
 Ted Cruz, U.S. Senator from Texas (2013–present), 3rd Solicitor General of Texas (2003–2008), candidate for president in 2016 (running for re-election)
 Joni Ernst, U.S. Senator from Iowa (2015–present), member of the Iowa Senate from the 12th district (2011–2014), Auditor of Montgomery County (2005–2011)
 Josh Hawley, U.S. Senator from Missouri (2019–present), 42nd Missouri Attorney General (2017–2019) (running for re-election)
 Larry Hogan, 62nd Governor of Maryland (2015–2023), Secretary of Appointments for Maryland (2003–2007)
 Adam Kinzinger, United States Representative from IL-16 (2011–2023)
 Dan Patrick, 42nd Lieutenant Governor of Texas (2015–present), member of the Texas Senate from the 7th district (2007–2015)
 Rand Paul, U.S. Senator from Kentucky (2011–present), candidate for president in 2016
 Mike Rogers, United States Representative from MI-08 (2001–2015), member of the Michigan Senate from the 26th district (1995–2001)
 Mitt Romney, U.S. Senator from Utah (2019–present), 70th Governor of Massachusetts (2003–2007), candidate for president in 2008, Republican presidential nominee in 2012
 Marco Rubio, U.S. Senator from Florida (2011–present), 94th Speaker of the Florida House of Representatives (2006–2008) from the 111th district (2000–2008), member of the West Miami City Commission (1998–2000), candidate for president in 2016
 Paul Ryan, 54th Speaker of the United States House of Representatives (2015–2019) from WI-01 (1999–2019) and Republican vice presidential nominee in 2012
 Rick Scott, U.S. Senator from Florida (2019–present), 45th Governor of Florida (2011–2019) (running for reelection)
 Donald Trump Jr., businessman, executive vice president of The Trump Organization
 Ivanka Trump, Advisor to the President of the United States (2017–2021)
 Scott Walker, 45th Governor of Wisconsin (2011–2019), 5th Executive of Milwaukee County (2002–2010), member of the Wisconsin State Assembly from the 14th district (1993–2002), candidate for president in 2016

Vice presidential speculation 

Multiple reporters, political analysts and commentators have noted that Trump selecting Pence to be his running mate once again would be highly unlikely following rifts between the two over the future of the Republican Party and Pence's attempts to distance himself from the former president. In June 2022, the House Select Committee on the January 6 Attack found that Trump said Pence "deserved" calls to be hanged on the day of the attack. Pence has similarly stated that he has no interest in accepting the vice presidential nomination again.

Several individuals have received speculation about possible selection as vice presidential nominee in 2024 including Senator Tim Scott of South Carolina, Governor Kristi Noem of South Dakota, Governor Glenn Youngkin of Virginia, Senator Ted Cruz of Texas, Governor Ron DeSantis of Florida, Governor Kim Reynolds of Iowa, Senator Joni Ernst of Iowa, Senator Rick Scott of Florida, and Lieutenant Governor Jeanette Nuñez of Florida. There has been speculation that former U.S. Representative Lee Zeldin of New York could become DeSantis' running mate after his strong performance in the 2022 New York gubernatorial election. and both holding several rallies before and after the election together. Some have speculated that former United Nations Ambassador and former South Carolina governor Nikki Haley could be Trump's running mate. However, Haley launched a presidential campaign of her own on February 14, 2023, bringing the chances down.

On March 6, 2023, multiple sources close to Donald Trump, the current Republican front runner, as reported by Axios, ran the list down to four major contenders. These were Nikki Haley, former governor of South Carolina and United Nations Ambassador; Sarah Huckabee Sanders, former White House press secretary for Trump and recently elected governor of Arkansas, who has recently made a splash in the news for her executive orders; Kristi Noem, governor of South Dakota; and Kari Lake, candidate for Arizona Governor in 2022 who lost narrowly to Katie Hobbs. According to Axios, Trump's major factor in the race is loyalty, something he sees strongly in Lake, as she is a follower of the lies and conspiracy to overturn the results of the 2020 presidential election.

Timeline

Overview

Background 
After losing his re-election bid in 2020, Trump managed to remain the main front runner of the GOP. He would flex his muscle within the GOP, by recruiting challengers to several House members who had voted to impeach him, as well as pushing several candidates through for open races. Despite several conditions leading to the impression of a red wave, Republicans barely managed to win the House and lost ground in the Senate. The lackluster performance by Republicans, notably endorsed by Trump, and running in several tossups and areas Trump himself won, led to a hit in the polls. It is around this time that Governor of Florida Ron DeSantis began to see a huge increase in his polling numbers, largely because of his landslide victory in the 2022 Florida gubernatorial election. Media coverage consistently portrayed DeSantis as Trump's main rival, despite DeSantis not having announced a presidential run.

Debates 
The Republican National Committee (RNC) has announced that the first primary debate will be held in August 2023 in Milwaukee, Wisconsin. The RNC has started talks with major TV networks and other media companies seeking to host the debates.

Endorsements

Polling

See also
2024 United States presidential election
2024 Republican National Convention
2024 Democratic Party presidential primaries
2024 Democratic National Convention

Notes

References

External links 
Presidential Candidate Trump Announces South Carolina Campaign Leadership Team on C-SPAN

 
2023 in American politics
2024 United States presidential primaries
Political timelines of the 2020s by year